The 1972 European Judo Championships were the 21st edition of the European Judo Championships, and were held in Voorburg, Netherlands on 13 and 14 May 1971. Championships were subdivided into six individual competitions, and a separate team competition.

Medal overview

Individual

Teams

Medal table

References 
  Results of the 1972 European Judo Championships (JudoInside.com)

E
European Judo Championships
1972 in Dutch sport
Judo competitions in the Netherlands
International sports competitions hosted by the Netherlands